Just Dance Wii U is a 2014 dance rhythm game developed by Ubisoft Paris, Ubisoft Milan, Ubisoft Reflections, Ubisoft Romania, Ubisoft Pune and Ubisoft Montpellier and published by Nintendo for the Wii U. The third Japanese installment in the Just Dance series published by Ubisoft, it was revealed in a Nintendo Direct on 14 February 2014 and released on 3 April 2014 exclusively in Japan.

Gameplay

As in previous installments, players must mimic the routine of an on-screen dancer to a chosen song, scoring points based on their accuracy. The game requires Wii Remotes to dance.

The game is based on Just Dance 2014, with the user interface and features are largely identical to that said game, but it removes online multiplayer functionality ("World Dance Floor") and a few other features present in that game. However, the credits for that said game is also shown alongside the credits for this game.

Soundtrack
There are a total of 35 songs in the soundtrack, including twenty Japanese songs.

Reception

Famitsu gave the game a score of 32/40, with each reviewer giving it an 8.

Notes

References

2014 video games
Dance video games
Fitness games
Just Dance (video game series)
Music video games
Japan-exclusive video games
Ubisoft games
Video games developed in Romania
Video games developed in France
Wii U games
Wii U eShop games